Ekpene Ukim is a village in Uruan local government area of Akwa Ibom State, Nigeria. The Ibibio people are occupants of the Ekpene Ukim village.

References 

Populated places in Akwa Ibom State
Villages in Akwa Ibom